Brezhnev (masculine) or Brezhneva (feminine) is a Russian and Ukrainian surname.

Those bearing it include:

Leonid Brezhnev (1906–1982), a General Secretary of the Communist Party of the Soviet Union
Viktoria Brezhneva (1908–1995), wife of Leonid Brezhnev
Vladimir Brezhnev (1935–1996), Russian ice hockey player
Galina Brezhneva (1929–1998), daughter of Leonid Brezhnev
Yuri Brezhnev (1933–2013), son of Leonid Brezhnev
Lyubov Brezhneva, niece of Leonid Brezhnev
Vera Brezhneva (b. 1982), Ukrainian pop-singer

The name was applied from 1982 to 1988, in honor of Leonid Brezhnev, to the city of Naberezhnye Chelny in Tatarstan.

Ukrainian-language surnames
Russian-language surnames